The 1993 US Open was a tennis tournament played on outdoor hard courts at the USTA National Tennis Center in New York City in New York in the United States. It was the 113th edition of the US Open and was held from August 30 to September 12, 1993.

Seniors

Men's singles

 Pete Sampras defeated  Cédric Pioline 6–4, 6–4, 6–3
 It was Sampras's 3rd career Grand Slam title and his 2nd US Open title.

Women's singles

 Steffi Graf defeated  Helena Suková 6–3, 6–3
 It was Graf's 15th career Grand Slam title and her 3rd US Open title.

Men's doubles

 Ken Flach /  Rick Leach defeated  Karel Nováček /  Martin Damm 6–7(3–7), 6–4, 6–2
 It was Flach's 6th and last career Grand Slam title and his 2nd US Open title. It was Leach's 5th career Grand Slam title and his 1st US Open title.

Women's doubles

 Arantxa Sánchez Vicario /  Helena Suková defeated  Amanda Coetzer /  Inés Gorrochategui 6–4, 6–2
 It was Sánchez Vicario's 6th career Grand Slam title and her 1st US Open title. It was Suková's 9th career Grand Slam title and her 2nd US Open title.

Mixed doubles

 Helena Suková /  Todd Woodbridge defeated  Martina Navratilova /  Mark Woodforde 6–3, 7–6(8–6)
 It was Suková's 10th career Grand Slam title and her 3rd and last US Open title. It was Woodbridge's 5th career Grand Slam title and his 2nd US Open title.

Juniors

Boys' singles

 Marcelo Ríos defeated  Steven Downs 7–6, 6–3

Girls' singles

 Maria Francesca Bentivoglio defeated  Yuka Yoshida 7–6, 6–4

Boys' doubles

 Neville Godwin /  Gareth Williams defeated  Ben Ellwood /  James Sekulov 6–3, 6–3

Girls' doubles

 Nicole London /  Julie Steven defeated  Hiroko Mochizuki /  Yuka Yoshida 6–3, 6–4

Prize money

Total prize money for the event was $9,022,000.

In popular culture
In the Seinfeld episode "The Lip Reader" Jerry and George visit the 1993 US Open, where they can be seen sitting in the stands of an undisclosed outer court watching one of the three women's singles matches featuring a Croat. Kramer is also seen watching the Open on TV, where the reporter can be heard crediting a match win to Natalia Baudone, 3–6, 6–3, 7–5, over Mary Pierce. Pierce won the actual match 6–0, 6–7, 7–6. Kramer becomes a 'ballman' for the tournament later in the episode and accidentally injures Monica Seles in the final. Seles did not play in the tournament that year owing to an incident in April 1993 which prevented her from playing competitive tennis until August 1995.

References

External links
 Official US Open website

 
 

 
US Open
US Open (tennis) by year
US Open
US Open
US Open
US Open